Cholchol is a Chilean town and commune located in Cautín Province, Araucanía Region. The commune was created by Law 19,944 on April 22, 2004 by dividing off the northern area of the existing Nueva Imperial commune.

Demographics
Of these, 3,355 (33.3%) lived in urban areas and 6,710 (66.7%) in rural areas. The population grew by 9.3% (859 persons) between the 1992 and 2002 censuses.

Administration
As a commune, Cholchol is a third-level administrative division of Chile administered by a communal council, headed by an alcalde who is directly elected every four years. The 2012-presente alcalde is Luis Huirilef Barra. The communal council has the following members:
 Julio Torres López (UDI)
 Silvia Francisca Huirilef Barra (PPD)
 José Amador Matamala Molina (RN)
 Juan Neculhual Tropa (PPD)
 Israel Gutiérrez Narváez (DC)
 Samuel Curamil Huircapán (UDI)

Within the electoral divisions of Chile, Cholchol belongs to the 51st electoral district and 15th senatorial constituency.

References

External links
  Municipality of Cholchol

Communes of Chile
Populated places in Cautín Province
2004 establishments in Chile